The Dunstan Trail, also known as the Old Dunstan Road, is a historic route in Otago, New Zealand. The road was created during the Central Otago Gold Rush of the 1860s.

At the time of the road's creation, it was the shortest route from the city of Dunedin to the goldfields around Clyde, or Dunstan as it was then known. Known at the time as "The Mountain Track", it was a dangerous route which claimed numerous lives.

The road begins at Clarks Junction in the Strath-Taieri, where it meets SH 87, and extends to the northwest, crossing between the Lammermoor and Rock and Pillar Range before turning north. It climbs to almost  before dropping down to Paerau (known during the gold rush era as Styx). The trail crosses farmland and areas of subalpine tussock, passing close to Loganburn Reservoir, formerly the Great Moss Swamp.

Beyond Paerau, the trail becomes far rougher as it passes above the meanders and oxbow lakes of the upper Taieri River's scroll plain, and then descends towards Poolburn Reservoir, best known as a location during the filming of The Lord of the Rings trilogy of films. From here it turns toward the valley of the Manuherikia River, finishing at Moa Creek.

Today, the trail is a public road, ranging in quality from chip-sealed road to gravel track. Much of the route is only suitable for four-wheel drive vehicles, and the road as a whole is closed in winter months.

References

Roads in New Zealand
Geography of Otago
Scenic routes in New Zealand
Tourist attractions in Otago